Cory in the House is a spin-off of the Disney Channel Original Series, That's So Raven. It aired on Disney Channel from January 12, 2007 to September 12, 2008. A total of 34 episodes were produced, spanning 2 seasons. The show was about a teenager named Cory Baxter who moves from San Francisco to Washington, D.C. with his father Victor Baxter, who gets a job as head chef in the White House.

Series overview

Episodes

Season 1 (2007)

Season 2 (2007–08)

References

See also
 List of That's So Raven episodes
 List of Hannah Montana episodes - includes crossover episode "Take This Job and Love It"

External links
 
 List of episodes at TV MSN
 List of episodes at TV Guide

Lists of American sitcom episodes
Lists of American children's television series episodes
Lists of Disney Channel television series episodes